Badinogo may refer to:
Badinogo-1, village north of Kongoussi, Burkina Faso
Badinogo-2, village west of Kongoussi, Burkina Faso